Abdullah Waleed Al Sharbatly (born 21 September 1982 in London, England) is a Saudi Arabian equestrian who competes in the sport of show jumping. He is mostly known because of his win of the individual silver medal at the 2010 FEI World Equestrian Games.  He was part of the Saudi team that won the bronze medal at the 2012 Summer Olympics.

Career 
He started competing in England at the age of seven. He was Arab Champion at the age of sixteen. He first competed internationally in England at Hickstead. He has competed in the Asian Games, the Pan-Arab Games and in many Grand Prixes. He is sponsored by the Saudi Equestrian Fund.

Al Sharbatly became the first Middle Eastern medallist and finalist when he won the silver medal on Seldana di Campalto at the WEG Show Jumping Championships in Kentucky in 2010, coming second only to Belgium's Phillipe Le Jeune on his horse Vigo D'Arsouilles.

Major results 
World Championships:

 
World Cup Final:

 
Other Events:

Personal life 
Al Sharbatly currently resides in Jeddah, Saudi Arabia. He is married and by profession is a businessman and student, having obtained a BA in Business Administration and studied Computerisation, English, Economics and Marketing. He speaks English and Arabic. His most influential person is his father, because "he raised me well."

References

External links 
 
 
 

1982 births
Living people
Saudi Arabian male equestrians
Equestrians at the 2012 Summer Olympics
Olympic equestrians of Saudi Arabia
Olympic bronze medalists for Saudi Arabia
Olympic medalists in equestrian
Medalists at the 2012 Summer Olympics
Equestrians at the 2006 Asian Games
Equestrians at the 2010 Asian Games
Equestrians at the 2014 Asian Games
Equestrians at the 2018 Asian Games
Asian Games gold medalists for Saudi Arabia
Asian Games silver medalists for Saudi Arabia
Asian Games medalists in equestrian
Medalists at the 2006 Asian Games
Medalists at the 2010 Asian Games
Medalists at the 2014 Asian Games
Medalists at the 2018 Asian Games